A by-election was held for the New South Wales Legislative Assembly electorate of Sydney Hamlets on 17 June 1856 because Stuart Donaldson was appointed Colonial Secretary forming the Donaldson ministry. Under the constitution, ministers were required to resign to recontest their seats in a by-election when appointed. Of the other ministers, John Darvall comfortably won the by-election for Cumberland North Riding. Thomas Holt (Stanley Boroughs) and Bob Nichols (Northumberland Boroughs) were re-elected unopposed. William Manning was not required to resign as he held the office of Solicitor-General at the time of his election.

Dates

Result

Stuart Donaldson was appointed Colonial Secretary forming the Donaldson ministry.

See also
Electoral results for the district of Sydney Hamlets
List of New South Wales state by-elections

References

1856 elections in Australia
New South Wales state by-elections
1850s in New South Wales